Ammonium azide is the chemical compound with the formula , being the salt of ammonia and hydrazoic acid. Like other inorganic azides, this colourless crystalline salt is a powerful explosive, although it has a remarkably low sensitivity.  is physiologically active and inhalation of small amounts causes headaches and palpitations. It was first obtained by Theodor Curtius in 1890, along with other azides.

Structure
It is a structural isomer of tetrazene. Ammonium azide contains about 93% nitrogen by mass.

References

 
 
 

Azides
Explosive chemicals
Ammonium compounds